The Datong–Puzhou or Tongpu railway, is a major trunkline railroad in northern China, and the main axial railway of Shanxi Province. The railway is located entirely within Shanxi and diagonally bisects the province from Datong in the northeast to Fenglingdu, near the village of Puzhou, in the southwest corner. The line is often referred to by its northern and southern halves with Taiyuan, the provincial capital as the midpoint. Major cities and towns along route include Datong, Huairen, Shuozhou, Ningwu, Yuanping, Xinzhou, Taiyuan, Yuci, Taigu, Qi County, Pingyao, Huozhou, Hongdong, Linfen, Houma and Fenglingdu.

The section between Yuanping and Huairen is quadruple track, but the third/forth track is straight north–south rather than serving Shuozhou and Ningwu. This track is currently part of Datong–Xi'an passenger railway.

History
The Tongpu railway was built during Yan Xishan's administration of Shanxi Province. Yan initially appealed to the central government of the Republic of China for assistance to build a railway in Shanxi, and after being denied funding in 1928, embarked on his own railway building project. He hired a German surveyor team to plan the line. In 1930, when Yan lost power during the Central Plains War, the railway project temporarily halted. In 1932, Yan regained control of Shanxi and formed the Jinsui (Shanxi–Suiyuan) Army Construction Corp to build the line as a  narrow gauge railway, which the German team recommended to save cost. Construction began simultaneously on the North and South Tongpu Lines in May 1933. On August 1, 1935, the Taiyuan to Yuanping section entered into operation. By August 1937, the North Tongpu Line had reached within  of Datong but the fall of the city to the invading Japanese during the Second Sino-Japanese War halted construction. In 1939, the Japanese used forced labor to work on the remainder of the line. After the end of World War II, Yan regained control of the Shanxi and the Tongpu railway. During the ensuing Chinese Civil War, Communist forces and partisans sabotaged the North Tongpu Line, rendering it unusable until after the conflict. Reconstruction began in November 1949 and the entire line was converted into standard gauge and reopened to traffic in August 1951. The tunnel was completed in 1959. In the early 1980s, the North Tongpu Line underwent electrification to increase coal transport capacity.

Rail connections
Datong: Beijing–Baotou railway, Datong–Qinhuangdao railway
Ningwu: Ningwu–Kelan railway, Ningwu–Jingle railway
Yuanping: Beijing–Yuanping railway
Taiyuan: Shijiazhuang–Taiyuan railway, Taiyuan–Jiaozuo railway, Shitai Passenger railway
Hongdong: Shanxi–Henan–Shandong railway
Houma: Houma–Xian railway, Houma–Yueshan railway

See also

 List of railways in China

References

Railway lines in China
Rail transport in Shanxi
2 ft 6 in gauge railways in China
25 kV AC railway electrification